Andrew Meyer Ferreira (born Rusape, 26 June 1961) is a Zimbabwean former rugby union player and coach. He played as fullback.

Career
Ferreira's first cap for Zimbabwe was in the 1987 Rugby World Cup, where he played all the three pool stage matches against Romania, France and Scotland. He was also part of the 1991 Rugby World Cup squad, where he only played the match against Ireland, at Lansdowne Road, on 6 October 1991, which was his last cap for Zimbabwe.

Coaching career
As coach, Ferreira coached Zimbabwe Sevens.

Notes

External links
Andy Ferreira international stats

1961 births
People from Rusape
Sportspeople from Manicaland Province
Zimbabwean rugby union players
Zimbabwean rugby union coaches
Rugby union fullbacks
White Zimbabwean sportspeople
Zimbabwean people of Portuguese descent
Living people